The Monastery of Great Meteoron is an Eastern Orthodox monastery that is part of the Meteora monastery complex in Thessaly, central Greece. It is situated on top of a rock called Meteora or Platylithos, which is 415 metres above the Pineios valley floor.

History
The monastery was founded by Athanasius the Meteorite during the 14th century.

 was the abbot of the Monastery of Great Meteoron from 1961 to 1973, when he moved to Simonopetra and became the abbot there. His disciple Alexios, later known as Alexios of Xenophontos, then became the abbot of Great Meteoron from 1973 to 1976. In 1976, Alexios moved to Xenophontos Monastery.

Library
The Great Meteoron has the largest manuscript collection in Meteora. Out of 1,124 codices that were catalogued by N. Veis at the six Meteora monasteries, 610 were recorded at the Great Meteoron.

Nearby attractions
The Devil's Tower, a large towering rock, is located directly to the south of the monastery. It is next to the ruins of a former monastery on Ypsilotera Rock.

References

Great Meteoron
Greek Orthodox monasteries in Greece
Christian monasteries established in the 14th century